Falling Forward is the fourth album by English singer-songwriter Julia Fordham, released in 1994. The album includes the singles "Different Time, Different Place" (UK No. 41), "I Can't Help Myself" (UK No. 62) and "Hope, Prayer & Time" (UK No. 97).

Track listing
All tracks written by Julia Fordham, except where noted.

Personnel
Adapted from the album's liner notes.

Musicians

Julia Fordham – vocals, backing vocals
Alex Acuña – percussion
Stacy Campbell – backing vocals
Bobby Carlos – lap steel guitar
Gary Clark – backing vocals
Russell Ferrante – keyboards, piano, organ, Hammond B-3 organ
Isobel Griffiths – orchestral contractor
Mark Isham – trumpet
Barry Kinder – drums, percussion
Larry Klein – bass, percussion, keyboards
The LA Mass Choir – backing vocals (conducted by Donald Taylor)
Michael Landau – guitar, electric guitar
David Lasley – backing vocals
Greg Leisz – pedal steel guitar, mandolin
Iki Levy – percussion
Martin Loveday – cello
Jean McClain – backing vocals
Arnold McCuller – backing vocals
Ed Mann – vibraphone, marimba, bass marimba
Dominic Miller – guitar, nylon string guitar
Grant Mitchell – piano, string arrangement
Perry Montague-Mason – violin
Bill Payne – piano, Hammond B-3 organ
Brenda Russell – backing vocals
Vonda Shepard – backing vocals
Steuart Smith – acoustic guitar, electric guitar, mandolin
Philip Taylor – piano
Jorge Trivisonno – bandoneon
Carlos Vega – drums
Gavyn Wright – first violin

Production
Produced by Larry Klein and Julia Fordham
Recorded by Dan Marnien, except track 9 by Andy Bradfield
Mixed by Mike Shipley (tracks 1, 3–4, 6–7, 10–11) and Dan Marnien (tracks 2, 5, 8–9)
All backing vocals arranged by Julia Fordham, except track 4 by Julia Fordham and Angie Giles
Scored by David Campbell, except track 10 by Julia Fordham and Gary Clark, and track 6 by Julia Fordham and Simon Climie
Assistant engineers: Charlie Essers, Mark Guilbeault, Brian Kinkel, Thomas Mahn, Chad Munsey, Marnie Riley, Chip Mullane, Mark Haley, Shawn Berman, Dick Kaneshiro
Additional engineering: Rob Jaczko, Julie Last
Production coordinator: Marsha Burns
Design: Michael Nash Associates
Photography: Kate Garner

Charts

References

External links
Falling Forward at Discogs

1994 albums
Virgin Records albums
Julia Fordham albums
Albums produced by Larry Klein
Albums recorded at Westlake Recording Studios
Albums recorded at Olympic Sound Studios